Montello may refer to:

Places
Australia
Montello, Tasmania, a suburb of Burnie

Italy
Montello, Lombardy, a comune in the Province of Bergamo
Montello (hill), a historic hillock in the Province of Treviso

United States
Montello, Nevada
Montello, Pennsylvania
Montello, Wisconsin, a city
Montello Commercial Historic District
Montello (town), Wisconsin, adjacent to the city
Montello River, a river in Wisconsin
Montello station, an MBTA railway station in Brockton, Massachusetts

People
Daniel R. Montello (born 1959), American geographer and academic
Giuseppe Montello (born 1992), Italian biathlete
Josué Montello (1917–2006), Brazilian writer and diplomat
Merci Montello (born 1950), American model and actress

Other uses
Montello Bridging Finance, a defunct British real-estate finance company

See also
 Montella (disambiguation)